The Mil V-7 was an unusual experimental four-seat helicopter with AI-7 ramjets at the tips of the two rotor blades. It had an egg-shaped fuselage, skid undercarriage, and a two-bladed tail rotor on a short tubular tail boom. Four aircraft were built in the late 1950s, but only one is known to have flown, with only the pilot aboard.

Specifications

See also 
 list of experimental aircraft

References

1950s Soviet experimental aircraft
Abandoned military aircraft projects of the Soviet Union
V-7
1950s Soviet helicopters
Tipjet-powered helicopters
Ramjet-powered aircraft
aircraft first flown in 1959